Oftersheim is a municipality in the district of Rhein-Neckar-Kreis, in Baden-Württemberg,  Germany. It is situated 8 km southwest of  Heidelberg.

References

Rhein-Neckar-Kreis